Steve "Bozo" McFarlane is an Australian former professional rugby league footballer who played for Eastern Suburbs in NSWRL competition.

Playing career
McFarlane made his debut for Eastern Suburbs in Round 12 of the 1979 season against Balmain. The following year, McFarlane was a member of the Easts side which reached the 1980 NSWRL grand final against Canterbury.  He was denied a try in the first half of the match as Canterbury won their first premiership in 38 years, 18–4.  The following season, McFarlane was a member of the Easts side which made the preliminary final, but lost 15-5 to Newtown.  McFarlane played a further two seasons before retiring at the end of 1983.

References

1958 births
Rugby league players from Sydney
Sydney Roosters players
Rugby league wingers
Living people